Girls' High School & College is an English medium school and a private all-girls school for boarders and day scholars in Allahabad (Prayagraj) in the state of Uttar Pradesh in India, founded in 1861, the year of our lord to provide a Christian education to the children of Europeans and Anglo-Indians, but has always accepted children from all backgrounds. Though originally co-educational, it now admits only girls. The school curriculum is based on the ICSE format of education, and has teaching facilities from Kindergarten, 1 to 10 (ICSE) and 11 and 12 (ISC). The school belongs to the Allahabad School Society (AHSS). It caters only to girls and its counterpart – Boys' High School & College – caters to boys.

History

GHS was founded on 5 November 1861 by the Englishmen and women who were keen to advance the cause of education in Allahabad according to the doctrines of the Church of England, especially among the children of the European and Anglo-Indian descent. That from the very inception, the founders envisaged the admission of all communities is proved by the fact that Articles of Association provided a conscience clause for all those who for any reason preferred that their children be educated according to the doctrines of Church of England. It remained affiliated to University of Allahabad for 16 years i.e. from 1898 till 1914. The school was recognized for the Overseas Examination Board of Cambridge University till 1976 before being affiliated to ICSE and ISC. In those days, the University of Allahabad was an affiliating university and even High Schools and Inter Colleges all over the state and northern region, would be affiliated to this university as it was the only one right up to Peshawar. According to the Government Return for 1887, there were only 5 girls studying in Arts college in the whole country. Out of these 5 girl students, 4 were from Calcutta and one was from GHS.

School Motto

MENTEM FRONTEM QUE-That is the motto of Girls'High School & College which is a Latin phrase.
Rabindranath Tagore wrote:

"Where the mind is without fear and the head is held high"

Surely the great personalities, both past and present, realized that 'mind over matter' is the key to success in whatever sphere of life we embark upon. When the mind rules, both wisdom and practicality follow, paving the path of ultimate achievement.

So, when the mind is strong, the head will hold high.

School Song

This song of praise to our school we raise,
Our well loved G.H.S
Nor time nor place, can e'er efface
Her work of usefulness.
For all she's done, our gratitude she's won
And our love will ne'er grow less,
So we give three cheers, three hearty cheers,
To dear old G.H.S

CHORUS

Then shout with might and main.
Her praises once again.
With honest heart, she's played her part,
And constant she'll remain
With frame her work is crowned:
Her efforts are renowned,
Loudly profess the G.H.S,
so let her halls resound,

Oh, Lord we pray, from day to day,
This school to guide and bless.
We give and take, our efforts make;
For dear old G.H.S.
In the love may we make each task to be
One of joy and happiness.
Let us work the while, with a great big smile,
In the name of G.H.S.

SCHOOL HYMN

Heavenly Father, send thy Blessing
On thy children gathered here;
May we all, Thy name of confessing
Be to Thee for ever dear,
May we like joseph;loving,
Dutiful, and chaste and proving
Staedfast unto death endure.
Holy Saviour, Who in meekness

Didst vouchsafe a child to be,
Guide our steps and help our weakness,
Bless and make us like to Thee.
bear Thy lambs when They are weary
In Thine arms and thy breast;
Through life's desert dry and deary
Bring us to Thy heavenly rest.

Spread Thy golden pinions o'er us
holy Spirit, heavenly Dove;
Guide us, lead us, go before us,
Oh, Lord, we pray, from day to day,
This school to guide and bless.
We give and take, our efforts make ;
For dear old G.H.S.
In thy love may we make each task to be
One of joy and happiness.
Let us work the while, with a great big smile,
In the name of G.H.S.

School Houses
GHS has 4 houses namely
Bailey house- Green
Arthur house- Blue
Jahans house- Yellow
Knox house- Red

Founder's Day Tradition

Girls' High School & College (GHS) celebrates its Founder's Day on 5 November every year by the students and the teachers. On this occasion, an impressive Thanksgiving Service is held at the historic All Saints' Cathedral where students of Girls' High School (GHS), Boys' High School (BHS) and College and its annexe, Holy Trinity School (HTS) march in unison all the way to the All Saints' Cathedral from their respective institutions to offer Thanksgivings to the founders. The squad of the respective schools are led by the College Captain and the Headgirl.
In 2011, the school celebrated the Sesquicentennial Year with much pomp and show.

References

External links
School website

Christian schools in Uttar Pradesh
Girls' schools in Uttar Pradesh
Boarding schools in Uttar Pradesh
Private schools in Uttar Pradesh
Primary schools in Uttar Pradesh
High schools and secondary schools in Uttar Pradesh
Schools in Allahabad
Educational institutions established in 1861
1861 establishments in British India